Donaghadee is a civil parish in County Down, Northern Ireland. It is situated in the historic barony of Ards Lower.

Settlements
Settlements within Donaghadee civil parish include:
Carrowdore
Donaghadee
Millisle

Townlands
Donaghadee civil parish contains the following 30 townlands:

Ballybuttle
Ballycopeland
Ballycross
Ballydoonan
Ballyfrenis
Ballyhaskin
Ballyhay
Ballymacruise
Ballymoney
Ballynoe
Ballyrawer
Ballyrolly
Ballyvester
Ballywilliam
Ballywhiskin
Carney Hill
Carryreagh
Craigboy
Drumfad
Ganaway
Grangee
Herdstown
Hogstown
Islandhill
Kilbright
Killaghy
Miller Hill
Sloanstown
Templepatrick
Town Parks of Donaghadee

See also
List of civil parishes of County Down

References